Off Center is a collection of five science fiction short stories by Damon Knight. They stories were originally published between 1952 and 1964 in Galaxy, If and other science fiction magazines.

The first printing, by Ace, was bound dos-à-dos with Knight's The Rithian Terror as Ace Double M-113. In 1969, the book was re-issued in the UK by Gollancz with the title Off Centre; the novella was omitted and three additional stories were included: "Dulcie and Decorum", "Masks" and "To Be Continued".

Contents
 "What Rough Beast"
 "The Second-Class Citizen"
 "Be My Guest"
 "God's Nose"
 "Catch That Martian"

External links

1965 short story collections
Science fiction short story collections
Works by Damon Knight
Ace Books books